Several ships of the French Navy have been named Casabianca. Luc-Julien-Joseph Casabianca was a French naval officer, killed at the Battle of the Nile in 1798 during the French Revolutionary Wars.

 Casabianca was an armed djerme on the Nile in 1798.
 Casabianca was a paddle-wheel aviso between 1859 and 1877.
  was a  aviso between 1895 and 1915.
  was a  launched in 1936 and scrapped in 1952.
  was a  launched in 1954 and scrapped in 1983.
  is a  nuclear attack submarine launched in 1984 and currently in service.
  is the 6th planned  nuclear attack submarine.

French Navy ship names